War Live (translit. Rat uživo) is a 2000 Yugoslavian film directed by Darko Bajić. It was Yugoslavia's submission to the 74th Academy Awards for the Academy Award for Best Foreign Language Film, but was not accepted as a nominee.

See also
Cinema of Yugoslavia
List of submissions to the 74th Academy Awards for Best Foreign Language Film

References

External links

2000 films
2000s war drama films
Yugoslav Wars films
Serbian war drama films
2000s Serbian-language films
Yugoslav war drama films
Films set in Serbia
Films set in Belgrade
2000 drama films
Films shot in Serbia